The 14th Vietnam Film Festival was held from November 4 to November 11, 2004 in Buôn Ma Thuột City, Đắk Lắk Province, Vietnam, with the slogan: "For an advanced Vietnam cinema imbued with national identity" (Vietnamese: "Vì một nền điện ảnh Việt Nam tiên tiến, đậm đà bản sắc dân tộc").

Event 
This is the first film festival held in the Central Highlands, the first time a non-state cinema unit has submitted works, marking a new turning point in the implementation of the country's policy of socializing cinema. It was also announced that: "For the first time there will be the Technique Award and the Most Popular Film award. These are calculated for each genre, to encourage cinematographers to develop their talents." But later in the award ceremony, the most popular film award was cancelled. "Because the number of votes for the "most popular" films is too scattered, no film can reach more than half of the total votes, so it cannot be awarded," said Mrs. Nguyễn Thị Hồng Ngát, Deputy Director of the Cinema Department.

Participation 
A total of 101 films entered the festival: 22 feature films, 15 direct-to-video feature films, 46 documentaries/science films (16 feature films & 30 direct-to-video films) and 18 animated films. 4 Golden Lotuses was awarded to the feature film "Người đàn bà mộng du", the direct-to-video film "Mùa sen", the documentary film "Thang đá ngược ngàn" and the animated film "Chuyện về những đôi giày".

A surprise was the Silver Lotus award given to the private film "Những cô gái chân dài". This is the first time a private film has entered the Film Festival. It is suggested that this is just an encouragement. However, according to the criteria of this film festival, this is an example of a cinema that is gradually reaching the audience.

Activities 
The film screening program and exchanges with the film crew before the screenings will take place from November 4th to 7th at Hưng Đạo Cinema, Kim Đồng Cinema and Provincial Party Hall of Đắk Lắk Province in the morning (8:00), afternoon (14:00) and evening (19:00).

The conference within the framework of this film festival also has a big difference. Previously, the seminars focused only on the professional, the situation of film production ("input" of the films). This time, only one seminar was held, which is "Solutions to attract movie audiences" (Vietnamese: "Giải pháp thu hút khán giả điện ảnh"). This shows the beginning of interest in the "output" of the movies.

The festival also includes the following activities:
On November 5, a seminar on Vietnamese films (8:30); Artists interact with workers at Thắng Lợi Coffee Farm (14:00); Exchange with the audience in Buôn Ma Thuột City at the Central House of Culture (19:00);
On November 6, the artist interacted with students of Tây Nguyên University (8:30) and at 19:00 interacted with border guards.
At 19:45 on November 7 at Ngã Sáu Square, the closing night of the 14th Vietnam Film Festival will take place and will be broadcast live on VTV.

Inadequacy 
The cancellation of the "public favorite" award without notice, the addition of a Silver Lotus award to "Những cô gái chân dài" while excluding or honoring films of high artistic quality that represent Judging criteria are quite arbitrary. It caused a reaction among artists and in public opinion.

The announcement that the awards were decided by the Steering Committee of the Film Festival on the basis of the proposal of the jury caused many questions and doubts. It is not known who the Steering Committee consists of, what is the level of artistic appraisal, whether you have seen the film, whether there is a collective decision? It is known that before the award ceremony, there were members of the Steering Committee who did not know anything about the award results because they were not discussed.

The festival also suffered from many technical errors in the organization. At the opening ceremony of the artists, the delegates were pushed up and down, running in and out to serve the director's script. The tiny logo made of white paper pasted on the font looks very sketchy. After the award ceremony, artists and journalists flocked to Thắng Lợi Hotel to attend a reception. The invitations began at 9:30 p.m., but they had to wait almost an hour without eating because the host was still outside the stage for the music show without an apology when the reception was delayed. .

Official Selection

Feature film 

Highlighted title indicates Golden Lotus winner.

Awards

Feature film

Direct-to-video

Documentary/Science film

Animated film

References 

Vietnam Film Festival
Vietnam Film Festival
Vietnam Film Festival
2004 in Vietnam